Russell Vis (June 22, 1900 – April 1, 1990) was an American amateur and professional wrestler. Before the Olympics, Vis was an AAU national champion. Vis competed at the 1924 Olympic Games in Paris, where he received a gold medal in the freestyle lightweight division. Vis then wrestled professionally as a welterweight for three years, but quickly grew tired of the pro circuit and retired in 1930. In 1977, Vis was inducted into the National Wrestling Hall of Fame as a Distinguished Member.

References

1900 births
1990 deaths
Wrestlers at the 1924 Summer Olympics
American male sport wrestlers
American male professional wrestlers
Olympic gold medalists for the United States in wrestling
Medalists at the 1924 Summer Olympics
Sportspeople from Grand Rapids, Michigan